The 1991–92 season was the 61st season for Real Madrid C.F. in La Liga.

Summary
Real Madrid endured a trophy-less season for the second season in a row. Real Madrid failed to won the league title despite mostly took a lead after a 3-2 defeat against Tenerife on the last day of the league. Successful Serbian-coach Radomir Antić was suddenly sacked in January despite Real led the league in the standings.

On the other hand, Real lost the Copa del Rey 1992 final to Atlético Madrid and also Real suffered embarrassed 1991-92 UEFA Cup exit against Torino.

Squad

Transfers

In

from Real Sociedad
from Sporting Gijón
from Crvena Zvezda
from São Paulo FC

Out

 to CD Logroñés
 to Atlético Madrid
 to Real Valladolid
 to Real Zaragoza
 to CA Osasuna
 to Albacete Balompié

Competitions

La Liga

League table

Results by round

Matches

Copa del Rey

Round of 16

Quarter-finals

Semi-finals

Final

UEFA Cup

First round

Second round

Third round

Quarter-finals

Semi-finals

Statistics

Squad statistics

References

 Madrid – 1991–92 BDFutbol

Real
Real Madrid CF seasons